The Tyumen Oblast Duma is the regional parliament of Tyumen Oblast, a federal subject of Russia. A total of 48 deputies are elected for five-year terms.

Elections

2021

References

Tyumen Oblast
Politics of Tyumen Oblast